Ethiopia is one of the oldest countries in Africa, the emergence of Ethiopian civilization dates back thousands of years. Due to migration and imperial expansion, it grew to include many other primarily Afro-Asiatic-speaking communities, including Amhara, Oromos, Somalis, Tigray, Afars, Sidama, Gurage, Agaw and Harari, among others.
One of the first kingdoms to rise to power in the territory was the kingdom of D'mt in the 10th century BC, which established its capital at Yeha. In the first century AD the Aksumite Kingdom rose to power in the Tigray Region with its capital at Aksum and grew into a major power on the Red Sea, subjugating Yemen and Meroe. In the early fourth century, during the reign of Ezana, Christianity was declared the state religion. Ezana's reign is also when the Aksumites first identified themselves as "Ethiopians", and not long after, Philostorgius became the first foreign author to call the Aksumites Ethiopians. The Aksumite empire fell into decline with the rise of Islam in the Arabian peninsula, which slowly shifted trade away from the Christian Aksum. It eventually became isolated, its economy slumped and Aksum's commercial domination of the region ended. The Aksumites gave way to the Zagwe dynasty, who established a new capital at Lalibela before giving way to the Solomonic dynasty in the 13th century. During the early Solomonic period, Ethiopia went through military reforms and imperial expansion that allowed it to dominate the Horn of Africa. Portuguese missionaries arrived at this time.

In 1529, the Adal Sultanate attempted to conquer Abyssinia and met initial success; the Adal were supplied by the Ottomans while Abyssinia received Portuguese reinforcements. By 1543, Abyssinia had recaptured lost territory but the war had weakened both sides. The Oromo people were able to expand into the highlands, conquering both the Adal Sultanate and Abyssinia. The Portuguese presence also increased, while the Ottomans began to push into what is now Eritrea, creating the Habesh Eyalet. The Portuguese brought modern weapons and baroque architecture to Ethiopia, and in 1622 converted the emperor Susenyos I to Catholicism, sparking a civil war which ended in his abdication and expulsion of all Catholics from Ethiopia. A new capital was established at Gondar in 1632, and a period of peace and prosperity ensued until the country was split apart by warlords in the 18th century during the Zemene Mesafint.

Ethiopia was reunified in 1855 under Tewodros II, beginning its modern history and his reign was followed by Yohannes IV who was killed in action in 1889. Under Menelik II Ethiopia started its transformation to well organized technological advancement and the structure that the country has now. Ethiopia assumed it's current modern border to the south and east after fighting off invaders that came from south , resulting in the borders of modern Ethiopia. Ethiopia defeated an Egyptian invasion in 1876 and an Italian invasion in 1896 which killed 17,000 Ethiopians, and came to be recognized as a legitimate state by European powers. A more rapid modernisation took place under Menelik II and Haile Selassie. Italy launched a second invasion in 1935. From 1935 to 1941, Ethiopia was under Italian occupation as part of Italian East Africa. The Allies managed to drive the Italians out of the country in 1941, and Haile Selassie was returned to the throne from his 5 years exiled in Britain. Ethiopia and Eritrea united in a federation, but when Haile Selassie ended the federation in 1961 and made Eritrea a province of Ethiopia, the 30-year Eritrean War of Independence broke out. Eritrea regained its independence after a referendum in 1993.

Haile Selassie was overthrown in 1974 and the militaristic Derg regime came to power. In 1977 Somalia invaded, trying to annex the Ogaden region, but were pushed back by Ethiopian, Soviet, and Cuban forces. In 1977 and 1978 the government tortured or killed hundreds of thousands of suspected enemies in the Red Terror. Ethiopia experienced famine in 1984 that killed one million people and civil war that resulted in the fall of the Derg in 1991. This resulted in the establishment of the Federal Democratic Republic under Meles Zenawi. Ethiopia remains highly impoverished, although its economy has become one of the world's fastest-growing. Civil conflict in the country, including the Metekel conflict and the Tigray War, are still ongoing.

Timeline

Prehistory

It was not until 1963 that evidence of the presence of ancient hominids was discovered in Ethiopia, many years after similar discoveries had been made in neighbouring Kenya and Tanzania. The discovery was made by Gerrard Dekker, a Dutch hydrologist, who found Acheulian stone tools that were over a million years old at the Kella site, near Awash. Since then many important finds have propelled Ethiopia to the forefront of palaeontology. The oldest hominid discovered to date in Ethiopia is the 4.2 million year old Ardipithicus ramidus (Ardi) found by Tim D. White in 1994. The most well known hominid discovery is Lucy, found in the Awash Valley of Afar Region in 1974 by Donald Johanson, and is one of the most complete and best preserved, adult Australopithecine fossils ever uncovered. Lucy's taxonomic name, Australopithecus afarensis, means 'southern ape of Afar', and refers to the Ethiopian region where the discovery was made. Lucy is estimated to have lived 3.2 million years ago.

There have been many other notable fossil findings in the country. In Gona stone tools were uncovered in 1992 that were 2.52 million years old, the oldest such tools discovered anywhere in the world. In 2010 fossilised animal bones, that were 3.4 million years old, were found with stone-tool-inflicted marks on them in the Lower Awash Valley by an international team, led by Shannon McPherron, which is the oldest evidence of stone tool use ever found anywhere in the world. In 2004 fossils found near the Omo river at Kibbish by Richard Leakey in 1967 were redated to 195,000 years old, the oldest date in East Africa for modern Homo sapiens.
Homo sapiens idaltu, found in the Middle Awash in Ethiopia in 1997, lived about 160,000 years ago.

Some of the earliest known evidence of early stone-tipped projectile weapons (a characteristic tool of Homo sapiens), the stone tips of javelins or throwing spears, were discovered in 2013 at the site of Gademotta, and date to around 279,000 years ago. In 2019, further evidence of Middle Stone Age complex projectile weapons was found at Aduma, also in Ethiopia, dated 100,000-80,000 years ago, in the form of points considered likely to belong to darts delivered by spear throwers.

Land of Punt

Punt was a kingdom recently found to encompass the Horn of Africa by the archaeological findings of Egyptian mummified baboons in modern-day Ethiopia. and caves in Somaliland dating back to around the time of Punt.
Egyptian traders from about 3000 BC refer to lands south of Nubia or Kush as Punt and Yam.
The Ancient Egyptians were in possession of myrrh (found in Punt), which Richard Pankhurst interprets to indicate trade between the two countries was extant from Ancient Egypt's beginnings. Pharaonic records indicate this possession of myrrh as early as the First and Second dynasties (3100–2888 BC), which was also a prized product of the Horn of Africa Region; inscriptions and pictorial reliefs also indicate ivory, panther and other animal skins, myrrh-trees and ostrich feathers from the African coastal belt; and in the Fourth Egyptian Dynasty (2789–2767 BC) a Puntite is mentioned to be in the service of the son of Cheops, the builder of the Great Pyramid. J. H. Breasted posited that this early trade relationship could have been realized through overland trade down the Nile and its tributaries (i.e. the Blue Nile and Atbara). The Greek historian and geographer Agatharchides had documented seafaring among the early Egyptians: "During the prosperous period of the Old Kingdom, between the 30th and 25th centuries B. C., the river-routes were kept in order, and Egyptian ships sailed the Red Sea as far as the myrrh-country."

The first known voyage to Punt occurred in the 25th century BC under the reign of Pharaoh Sahure. The most famous expedition to Punt, however, comes during the reign of Queen Hatshepsut probably around 1495 BC, as the expedition was recorded in detailed reliefs on the temple of Deir el-Bahri at Thebes. The inscriptions depict a trading group bringing back myrrh trees, sacks of myrrh, elephant tusks, incense, gold, various fragmented wood, and exotic animals. Detailed information about these two nations is sparse, and there are many theories concerning their locations and the ethnic relationship of their peoples. The Egyptians sometimes called the Land of Punt, "God's-Land", due to the "large quantities of gold, ivory, and myrrh that could be easily obtained". 

Evidence of Naqadan contacts include obsidian from Ethiopia and the Aegean. Though not much is known, it is highly likely that Punt fell due to ethnic tensions between Somali and Ethiopians, splitting to form 2 different kingdoms, Macrobia and D'mt at around the 1st millennium BC.

Antiquity

Etymology
Ancient Greek historians such as Herodotus and Diodorus Siculus used the word Aethiopia (Αἰθιοπία) in reference to the peoples who live immediately to the south of ancient Egypt, specifically, the area which is now known as the ancient Kingdom of Kush, now a part of modern-day Nubia in Egypt and Sudan, and generally, all of Sub-Saharan Africa. The name Aethiopia comes from the ancient Greek word "Aethiops" (burned-look).

In ancient times, the name Ethiopia was primarily used in reference to the modern-day nation of Sudan which is based in the Upper Nile valley and is located south of Egypt, also called Kush, and then secondarily in reference to Sub-Saharan Africa in general. Reference to the Kingdom of Aksum (designated as Ethiopia) only dates as far back as the first half of the 4th century AD, following the 4th century AD invasion of Kush in Sudan by the Aksumite empire. An older inscription by Ezana Habashat (the source for "Abyssinia") in Ge'ez, South Arabian alphabet, was then translated into Greek as "Aethiopia".

The state of Sheba which is mentioned in the Old Testament is sometimes believed to have existed in Ethiopia, but it is more frequently placed in Yemen. According to the Ethiopian narrative, best represented in the Kebra Nagast, the Queen of Sheba slept with King Solomon and bore a child who was named Ebn Melek (later Emperor Menelik I). When he was of age, Menelik returned to Israel to see his father, who ordered the son of Zadok to accompany him back to Ethiopia along with a replica of the Ark of the Covenant (Ethiosemitic: tabot). Upon his return with some of the Israelite priests, however, he found that Zadok's son had stolen the real Ark of the Covenant. Today, some believe that the Ark is still being preserved at the Church of Our Lady Mary of Zion in Axum, Ethiopia. The belief that the biblical Queen of Sheba was a ruler of Ethiopia who visited King Solomon in Jerusalem in ancient Israel is supported by the 1st century AD Jewish historian Flavius Josephus, who identified Solomon's visitor as a queen of Egypt and Ethiopia.

Dʿmt

The first kingdom known to have existed in Ethiopia was the kingdom of D'mt, which rose to power around the year 980 BC. Its capital was at Yeha, where a Sabaean style temple was built around 700 BC. The D'mt kingdom was influenced by the Sabaeans in Yemen, however it is not known to what extent. While it was once believed that D'mt was a Sabaean colony, it is now believed that Sabaean influence was minor, limited to a few localities, and disappeared after a few decades or a century, perhaps representing a trading or military colony in some sort of symbiosis or military alliance with the civilization of Dʿmt or some other proto-Aksumite state. Few inscriptions by or about this kingdom survive and very little archaeological work has taken place. As a result, it is not known whether Dʿmt ended as a civilization before Aksum's early stages, evolved into the Aksumite state, or was one of the smaller states united in the Aksumite kingdom possibly around the beginning of the 1st century.

Axum

The first verifiable kingdom of great power to rise in Ethiopia was that of Axum in the 1st century CE. It was one of many successor kingdoms to Dʿmt and was able to unite the northern Ethiopian Highlands beginning around the 1st century BCE. They established bases on the northern highlands of the Ethiopian Plateau and from there expanded southward. The Persian religious figure Mani listed Axum with Rome, Persia, and China as one of the four great powers of his time. The origins of the Axumite Kingdom are unclear, although experts have offered their speculations about it. Even who should be considered the earliest known king is contested: although Carlo Conti Rossini proposed that Zoskales of Axum, mentioned in the Periplus of the Erythraean Sea, should be identified with one Za Haqle mentioned in the Ethiopian King Lists (a view embraced by later historians of Ethiopia such as Yuri M. Kobishchanov and Sergew Hable Sellasie), G.W.B. Huntingford argued that Zoskales was only a sub-king whose authority was limited to Adulis, and that Conti Rossini's identification can not be substantiated.

Inscriptions have been found in southern Arabia celebrating victories over one GDRT, described as "nagashi of Habashat [i.e. Abyssinia] and of Axum." Other dated inscriptions are used to determine a floruit for GDRT (interpreted as representing a Ge'ez name such as Gadarat, Gedur, Gadurat or Gedara) around the beginning of the 3rd century CE. A bronze scepter or wand has been discovered at Atsbi Dera with an inscription mentioning "GDR of Axum". Coins showing the royal portrait began to be minted under King Endubis toward the end of the 3rd century CE.

Introduction of Christianity

Christianity was introduced into the country by Frumentius, who was consecrated first bishop of Ethiopia by Saint Athanasius of Alexandria about 330 CE. Frumentius converted Ezana, who left several inscriptions detailing his reign both before and after his conversion.

One inscription which was found at Axum states that he conquered the nation of the Bogos, and returned thanks to his father, the god Mars, for his victory. Later inscriptions show Ezana's growing attachment to Christianity, and Ezana's coins bear this out, shifting from a design with disc and crescent to a design with a cross. Expeditions by Ezana into the Kingdom of Kush at Meroe in Sudan may have brought about its demise, though there is evidence that the kingdom was experiencing a period of decline beforehand. As a result of Ezana's expansions, Aksum bordered the Roman province of Egypt. The degree of Ezana's control over Yemen is uncertain. Though there is little evidence supporting Aksumite control of the region at that time, his title, which includes King of Saba and Salhen, Himyar and Dhu-Raydan (all in modern-day Yemen), along with gold Aksumite coins with the inscriptions, "King of the Habshat" or "Habashite", indicate that Aksum might have retained some legal or actual footing in the area.

Toward the end of the 5th century CE, a group of monks known as the Nine Saints are believed to have established themselves in the country. Since that time, monasticism has been a power among the people, and not without its influence on the course of events.

Once again, the Axumite Kingdom is recorded as controlling part – if not all – of Yemen in the 6th century CE. Around 523 CE, the Jewish king Dhu Nuwas came to power in Yemen and after he announcing that he would kill all of the Christians, he attacked an Aksumite garrison at Zafar, burning the city's churches. He then attacked the Christian stronghold of Najran, slaughtering the Christians who would not convert to Judaism.

Emperor Justin I of the Eastern Roman Empire requested that his fellow Christian, Kaleb, help fight the Yemenite king. Around 525 CE, Kaleb invaded and defeated Dhu Nuwas, appointing his Christian follower Sumuafa' Ashawa' as his viceroy. This dating is tentative, however, as the basis of the year 525 CE for the invasion is based on the death of the ruler of Yemen at the time, who very well could have been Kaleb's viceroy. Procopius records that after about five years, Abraha deposed the viceroy and made himself king (Histories 1.20). Despite several attempted invasions across the Red Sea, Kaleb was unable to dislodge Abreha, and acquiesced in the change; this was the last time Ethiopian armies left Africa until the 20th century CE when several units participated in the Korean War. Eventually Kaleb abdicated in favor of his son Wa'zeb and retired to a monastery, where he ended his days. Abraha later made peace with Kaleb's successor and recognized his suzerainty. Despite this reverse, under Ezana and Kaleb the kingdom was at its height, benefiting from a large trade, which extended as far as India and Ceylon, and were in constant communication with the Byzantine Empire.

Details about the history of the Axumite Kingdom, never abundant, became scarcer after this point. The last king of Axum who is known to have minted coins was Armah, whose coinage refers to the Persian conquest of Jerusalem in 614 CE. According to an early Muslim tradition, the Negus Sahama offered asylum to a group of Muslims who were fleeing from persecution during Muhammad's lifetime (615 CE), but Stuart Munro-Hay believes that Axum had been abandoned as the capital by that time – although Kobishchanov states that Ethiopian raiders plagued the Red Sea, preying on Arabian ports at least as late as 702 CE.

Some people believe that the end of the Axumite Kingdom is as mysterious as the beginning of it is. Lacking a detailed history, the kingdom's fall has been attributed to a persistent drought, overgrazing, deforestation, a plague, a shift in trade routes that reduced the importance of the Red Sea—or a combination of all of these factors. Munro-Hay cites the Muslim historian Abu Ja'far al-Khwarazmi/Kharazmi (who wrote before 833 CE) as stating that the capital of "the kingdom of Habash" was Jarma. Unless Jarma is a nickname for Axum (hypothetically from Ge'ez girma, "remarkable, revered"), the capital had moved from Axum to a new site, yet undiscovered.

Middle Ages

Zagwe dynasty

About 1000 (presumably c. 960, though the date is uncertain), a Jewish princess, Yodit(Judith) or nicknamed "Gudit", conspired to murder all the members of the royal family and establish herself as monarch. According to legends, during the execution of the royals, an infant heir of the Axumite monarch was carted off by some faithful adherents and conveyed to Shewa, where his authority was acknowledged. Concurrently, Gudit reigned for forty years over the rest of the kingdom and transmitted the crown to her descendants. Though parts of this story were most likely made up by the Solomonic dynasty to legitimize its rule, it is known that a female ruler did conquer the country about this time.

At one point during the next century, the last of Yodit's successors were overthrown by an Agaw lord named Mara Takla Haymanot, who founded the Zagwe dynasty (named after the Agaw people who ruled during this time) and married a female descendant of the Aksumite monarchs ("son-in-law") or previous ruler. Exactly when the new dynasty came to power is unknown, as is the number of kings in the dynasty. The new Zagwe dynasty established its capital at Roha (also called Adefa), where they build a series of monolithic churches. These structures are traditionally ascribed to the King Gebre Mesqel Lalibela, with the city being renamed Lalibela in his honour; though in truth some of them were built before and after him. The architecture of the Zagwe shows a continuation of earlier Aksumite traditions, as can be seen at Lalibela and at Yemrehana Krestos Church. The building of rock-hewn churches, which first appeared in the late Aksumite era and continued into the Solomonic dynasty, reached its peak under the Zagwe.

The Zagwe dynasty controlled a smaller area than the Aksumites or the Solomonic dynasty, with its core in the Lasta region. The Zagwe seem to have ruled over a mostly peaceful state with a flourishing urban culture, in contrast to the more warlike Solomonids with their mobile capitals. David Buxton remarked that the Zagwe achieved 'a degree of stability and technical advancement seldom equalled in Abyssinian history'. The church and state were very closely linked, and they may have had a more theocratic society than the Aksumites or Solomonids, with three Zagwe kings being canonized as saints and one possibly being an ordained priest.

Foreign affairs
Unlike the Aksumites, the Zagwe were very isolated from the other Christian nations, although they did maintain a degree of contact through Jerusalem and Cairo. Like many other nations and denominations, the Ethiopian Church maintained a series of small chapels and even an annex at the Church of the Holy Sepulchre. Saladin, after retaking the Holy City in 1187, expressly invited the Ethiopian monks to return and even exempted Ethiopian pilgrims from the pilgrim tax. His two edicts provide evidence of Ethiopia's contact with these Crusader States during this period. It was during this period that the Ethiopian king Gebre Mesqel Lalibela ordered the construction of the legendary rock-hewn churches of Lalibela.

Later, as the Crusades were dying out in the early fourteenth century, the Ethiopian Emperor Wedem Arad dispatched a thirty-man mission to Europe, where they travelled to Rome to meet the Pope and then, since the Medieval Papacy was in schism, they travelled to Avignon to meet the Antipope. During this trip, the Ethiopian mission also travelled to France, Spain and Portugal in the hopes of building an alliance against the Muslim states then threatening Ethiopia's existence. Plans were even drawn up of a two-pronged invasion of Egypt with the French King, but nothing ever came of the talks, although this brought Ethiopia back to Europe's attention, leading to expansion of European influence when the Portuguese explorers reached the Indian Ocean.

Early Solomonic period (1270–1529)

Around 1270, a new dynasty was established in the Abyssinian highlands under Yekuno Amlak, with aid from neighboring Makhzumi dynasty deposed the last of the Zagwe kings and married one of his daughters. According to legends, the new dynasty were male-line descendants of Aksumite monarchs, now recognized as the continuing Solomonic dynasty (the kingdom being thus restored to the biblical royal house). This legend was created to legitimize the Solomonic dynasty and was written down in the 14th century in the Kebra Negast, an account of the origins of the Solomonic dynasty.

Under the Solomonic dynasty, the chief provinces became Tigray (northern), what is now Amhara (central) and Shewa (southern). The seat of government, or rather of overlordship, had usually been in Amhara or Shewa, the ruler of which, calling himself nəgusä nägäst, exacted tribute, when he could, from the other provinces. The title of nəgusä nägäst was to a considerable extent based on their alleged direct descent from Solomon and the queen of Sheba; but it is needless to say that in many, if not in most, cases their success was due more to the force of their arms than to the purity of their lineage. Under the early Solomonic dynasty Ethiopia engaged in military reforms and imperial expansion which left it dominating the Horn of Africa, especially under the rule of Amda Seyon I. There was also great artistic and literary advancement at this time, but also a decline in urbanisation as the Solomonic emperors didn't have any fixed capital, but rather moved around the empire in mobile camps.

Under the early Solomonic dynasty monasticism grew strongly. The abbot Abba Ewostatewos created a new order called the Ewostathians who called for reforms in the church, including observance of the Sabbath, but was persecuted for his views and eventually forced into exile, eventually dying in Armenia. His zealous followers, also persecuted, formed isolated communities in Tigray. The movement grew strong enough that the emperor Dawit I, after first trying to crush the movement, legalized their observance of the Sabbath and proselytization of their faith. Finally under Zara Yaqob a compromise was made between the new Egyptian bishops and the Ewostathians at the Council of Mitmaq in 1450, restoring unity to the Ethiopian church.

Relations with Europe and "Prester John"
An interesting side-effect of Ethiopian Christianity was the way it intersected with a belief that had long prevailed in Europe of the existence of a Christian kingdom in the far east, whose monarch was known as Prester John. Originally thought to have been in the Orient, eventually the search for Prester John's mythical kingdom focused on Africa and particularly, the Christian empire in Ethiopia. This was first noticed when Zara Yaqob sent delegates to the Council of Florence in order to establish ties with the papacy and Western Christianity. They were confused when they arrived and council prelates insisted on calling their monarch Prester John, trying to explain that nowhere in Zara Yaqob's list of regnal names did that title occur. However, the delegates' admonitions did little to stop Europeans from referring to the monarch as their mythical Christian king, Prester John.

Towards the close of the 15th century the Portuguese missions into Ethiopia began. Among others engaged in this search was Pêro da Covilhã, who arrived in Ethiopia in 1490, and, believing that he had at length reached the far-famed kingdom, presented to the nəgusä nägäst of the country (Eskender at the time) a letter from his master the king of Portugal, addressed to Prester John. Covilhã would establish positive relations between the two states and go on to remain there for many years. In 1509, Empress Dowager Eleni, the underage Emperor's regent, sent an Armenian named Matthew to the king of Portugal to request his aid against the Muslims. In 1520, the Portuguese fleet, with Matthew on board, entered the Red Sea in compliance with this request, and an embassy from the fleet visited the Emperor, Lebna Dengel, and remained in Ethiopia for about six years. One of this embassy was Father Francisco Álvares, who wrote one of the earliest accounts of the country.

The Ethiopian-Adal War (1529–1543)

Between 1528 and 1540, the Adal Sultanate attempted, under Ahmad ibn Ibrihim al-Ghazi, to conquer the Ethiopian Empire. Entering, from the low arid country to the south-east with support from the Ottomans, Arabs and mercenaries from foreign lands on pretext of a Jihad, encroached upon much of the Ethiopian plateau, forcing the Emperor to take refuge in the mountain fastnesses. In this remote location, the Empress turned to the Portuguese for military assistance against Ottoman guns. João Bermudes, a subordinate member of the mission of 1520, who had remained in the country after the departure of the embassy, was sent to Lisbon. Bermudes claimed to be the ordained successor to the Abuna (archbishop), but his credentials are disputed.

In response to Bermudes message, a Portuguese fleet under the command of Estêvão da Gama, was sent from India and arrived at Massawa in February 1541. Here he received an ambassador from the Empress beseeching him to send help against the Muslims, and in the July following a force of 400 musketeers, under the command of Cristóvão da Gama, younger brother of the admiral, marched into the interior at first were successful against the enemy; but subsequently defeated at the Battle of Wofla (28 August 1542), and their commander captured and executed. The 120 surviving Portuguese soldiers fled with Queen Mother Seble Wongel and regrouped with Ethiopian forces led by the Emperor to enact several defeats on the Adal over late 1542 and early 1543. On February 21, 1543, Al-Ghazi was shot and killed in the Battle of Wayna Daga and his forces were totally routed. After this, quarrels arose between the Emperor and Bermudes, who had returned to Ethiopia with Gama and now urged the emperor to publicly profess his obedience to Rome. This the Emperor refused to do, and at length Bermudes was obliged to make his way out of the country.

Oromo migrations

The Oromo migrations were a series of expansions in the 16th and 17th centuries by the Oromo people from southern areas of Ethiopia to more northern regions. The migrations had a severe impact on the Solomonic dynasty of Abyssinia, as well as an impact to the recently weakened Adal Sultanate. The migrations concluded in around 1710, when the Oromo conquered the kingdom of Ennarea in the Gibe region.

In the 17th century, Ethiopian emperor Susenyos I relied on Oromo support to gain power, and married an Oromo woman. While initial relations between the Oromo and Amhara were cordial, conflict erupted after the emperor tried to convert the Oromo to Christianity. Many Oromo entered in emperor Susenyos' domain in response.

In the 17th and 18th centuries, much of the Oromo people gradually underwent conversion to Islam, especially around Harar, Arsi and Bale. The Oromo Muslims regarded the Imam of Harar as their spiritual guide, while retaining some of their original culture and socio-political organisation. Scholars believe the Oromo converted to Islam as a means of preserving their identity and a bulwark against assimilation into Ethiopia.

By late 17th century, the Oromo had friendly relations with the Amharas. So when emperor Iyasu I tried to attack the Oromo, he was convinced by local Amharic rulers to back down. The Oromo also formed political coalitions with previously subdued people of Ethiopia, including the Sidama people and the locals of Ennarea, Gibe and Kingdom of Damot.

Gondarine period

Gondar as a third permanent capital (after Aksum and Lalibela) of the Christian Kingdom was founded by Emperor Fasilides in 1636. It was the most important center of commerce for the Empire.

Early Gondar period (1632–1769)

The Jesuits who had accompanied or followed the Gama expedition into Ethiopia, and fixed their headquarters at Fremona (near Adwa), were oppressed and neglected, but not actually expelled. In the beginning of the 17th century Father Pedro Páez arrived at Fremona, a man of great tact and judgment, who soon rose into high favour at court, and won over the emperor to his faith. He directed the erection of churches, palaces and bridges in different parts of the country, and carried out many useful works. His successor Afonso Mendes was less tactful, and excited the feelings of the people against him and his fellow Europeans. Upon the death of Emperor Susenyos and accession of his son Fasilides in 1633, the Jesuits were expelled and the native religion restored to official status. Fasilides made Gondar his capital and built a castle there which would grow into the castle complex known as the Fasil Ghebbi, or Royal Enclosure. Fasilides also constructed several churches in Gondar, many bridges across the country, and expanded the Church of Our Lady Mary of Zion in Aksum.

During this time of religious strife Ethiopian philosophy flourished, and it was during this period that the philosophers Zera Yacob and Walda Heywat lived. Zera Yaqob is known for his treatise on religion, morality, and reason, known as Hatata.

Aussa Sultanate

The Sultanate of Aussa (Afar Sultanate) succeeded the earlier Imamate of Aussa. The latter polity had come into existence in 1577, when Muhammed Jasa moved his capital from Harar to Aussa with the split of the Adal Sultanate into Aussa and the Harari city-state. At some point after 1672, Aussa declined and temporarily came to an end in conjunction with Imam Umar Din bin Adam's recorded ascension to the throne.

The Sultanate was subsequently re-established by Kedafu around the year 1734, and was thereafter ruled by his Mudaito dynasty. The primary symbol of the Sultan was a silver baton, which was considered to have magical properties.

Zemene Mesafint

This era was, on one hand, a religious conflict between settling Muslims and traditional Christians, between nationalities they represented, and, on the other hand, between feudal lords on power over the central government.

Some historians date the murder of Iyasu I, and the resultant decline in the prestige of the dynasty, as the beginning of the Ethiopian Zemene Mesafint ("Era of the Princes"), a time of disorder when the power of the monarchy was eclipsed by the power of local warlords.

Nobles came to abuse their positions by making emperors, and encroached upon the succession of the dynasty, by candidates among the nobility itself: e.g. on the death of Emperor Tewoflos, the chief nobles of Ethiopia feared that the cycle of vengeance that had characterized the reigns of Tewoflos and Tekle Haymanot I would continue if a member of the Solomonic dynasty were picked for the throne, so they selected one of their own, Yostos to be negusa nagast (king of kings) – however his tenure was brief.

Iyasu II ascended the throne as a child. His mother, Empress Mentewab played a major role in Iyasu's reign, as well as her grandson Iyoas too. Mentewab had herself crowned as co-ruler, becoming the first woman to be crowned in this manner in Ethiopian history.

Empress Mentewab was crowned co-ruler upon the succession of her son (a first for a woman in Ethiopia) in 1730, and held unprecedented power over government during his reign. Her attempt to continue in this role following the death of her son 1755 led her into conflict with Wubit (Welete Bersabe), his widow, who believed that it was her turn to preside at the court of her own son Iyoas. The conflict between these two queens led to Mentewab summoning her Kwaran relatives and their forces to Gondar to support her. Wubit responded by summoning her own Oromo relatives and their considerable forces from Yejju.

The treasury of the Empire being allegedly penniless on the death of Iyasu, it suffered further from ethnic conflict between nationalities that had been part of the Empire for hundreds of years—the Agaw, Amharans, Showans, and Tigreans—and the Oromo newcomers. Mentewab's attempt to strengthen ties between the monarchy and the Oromo by arranging the marriage of her son to the daughter of an Oromo chieftain backfired in the long run. Iyasu II gave precedence to his mother and allowed her every prerogative as a crowned co-ruler, while his wife Wubit suffered in obscurity. Wubit waited for the accession of her own son to make a bid for the power wielded for so long by Mentewab and her relatives from Qwara. When Iyoas assumed the throne upon his father's sudden death, the aristocrats of Gondar were stunned to find that he more readily spoke in the Oromo language rather than in Amharic, and tended to favor his mother's Yejju relatives over the Qwarans of his grandmothers family. Iyoas further increased the favor given to the Oromo when adult. On the death of the Ras of Amhara, he attempted to promote his uncle Lubo governor of that province, but the outcry led his advisor Wolde Leul to convince him to change his mind.

It is believed that the power struggle between the Qwarans led by the Empress Mentewab, and the Yejju Oromos led by the Emperor's mother Wubit was about to erupt into an armed conflict. Ras Mikael Sehul was summoned to mediate between the two camps. He arrived and shrewdly maneuvered to sideline the two queens and their supporters making a bid for power for himself. Mikael settled soon as the leader of Amharic-Tigrean (Christian) camp of the struggle.

The reign of Iyaos' reign becomes a narrative of the struggle between the powerful Ras Mikael Sehul and the Oromo relatives of Iyoas. As Iyoas increasingly favored Oromo leaders like Fasil, his relations with Mikael Sehul deteriorated. Eventually Mikael Sehul deposed the Emperor Iyoas (7 May 1769). One week later, Mikael Sehul had him killed; although the details of his death are contradictory, the result was clear: for the first time an Emperor had lost his throne in a means other than his own natural death, death in battle, or voluntary abdication.

Mikael Sehul had compromised the power of the Emperor, and from this point forward it lay ever more openly in the hands of the great nobles and military commanders. This point of time has been regarded as one start of the Era of the Princes.

An aged and infirm imperial uncle prince was enthroned as Emperor Yohannes II. Ras Mikael soon had him murdered, and underage Tekle Haymanot II was elevated to the throne.

This bitter religious conflict contributed to hostility toward foreign Christians and Europeans, which persisted into the 20th century and was a factor in Ethiopia's isolation until the mid-19th century, when the first British mission, sent in 1805 to conclude an alliance with Ethiopia and obtain a port on the Red Sea in case France conquered Egypt. The success of this mission opened Ethiopia to many more travellers, missionaries and merchants of all countries, and the stream of Europeans continued until well into Tewodros's reign.

This isolation was pierced by very few European travellers. One was the French physician C.J. Poncet, who went there in 1698, via Sennar and the Blue Nile. After him James Bruce entered the country in 1769, with the object of discovering the sources of the Nile, which he was convinced lay in Ethiopia. Accordingly, leaving Massawa in September 1769, he travelled via Axum to Gondar, where he was well received by Emperor Tekle Haymanot II. He accompanied the king on a warlike expedition round Lake Tana, moving South round the eastern shore, crossing the Blue Nile (Abay) close to its point of issue from the lake and returning via the western shore. Bruce subsequently returned to Egypt at the end of 1772 by way of the upper Atbara, through the kingdom of Sennar, the Nile, and the Korosko desert.

During the 18th century the most prominent rulers were the emperor Dawit III of Gondar (died May 18, 1721), Amha Iyasus of Shewa, who consolidated his kingdom and founded Ankober, and Tekle Giyorgis of Amhara – the last-mentioned is famous as having been elevated to the throne altogether six times and also deposed six times. The first years of the 19th century were disturbed by fierce campaigns between Ras Gugsa of Begemder, and Ras Wolde Selassie of Tigray, who fought over control of the figurehead Emperor Egwale Seyon. Wolde Selassie was eventually the victor, and practically ruled the whole country till his death in 1816 at the age of eighty.
Dejazmach Sabagadis of Agame succeeded Wolde Selassie in 1817, through force of arms, to become warlord of Tigre.

Modern

1855–1936 
Under the Emperors Tewodros II (1855–1868), Yohannes IV (1872–1889), and Menelik II (1889–1913), the empire began to emerge from its isolation. Under Emperor Tewodros II, the "Age of the Princes" (Zemene Mesafint) was brought to an end.

Tewodros II and Tekle Giyorgis II (1855–1872) 

Emperor Tewodros (or Theodore) II was born Lij Kassa in Qwara, in 1818. His father was a small local chief, and his relative (possibly uncle) Dejazmach Kinfu was governor of the provinces of Dembiya, Qwara and Chelga between Lake Tana and the northwestern frontier. Kassa lost his inheritance upon the death of Kinfu while he was still a young boy. After receiving a traditional education in a local monastery, he went off to lead a band of bandits that roved the country in a Robin Hood-like existence. His exploits became widely known, and his band of followers grew steadily until he led a formidable army. He came to the notice of the ruling Regent, Ras Ali, and his mother Empress Menen Liben Amede (wife of the Emperor Yohannes III). In order to bind him to them, the Empress arranged for Kassa to marry Ali's daughter. He turned his attention to conquering the remaining chief divisions of the country, Gojjam, Tigray and Shewa, which still remained unsubdued. His relations with his father-in-law and grandmother-in-law deteriorated however, and he soon took up arms against them and their vassals, and was successful.

On February 11, 1855, Kassa deposed the last of the Gondarine puppet Emperors, and was crowned negusa nagast of Ethiopia under the name of Tewodros II. He soon after advanced against Shewa with a large army. Chief of the notables opposing him was its king Haile Melekot, a descendant of Meridazmach Asfa Wossen. Dissensions broke out among the Shewans, and after a desperate and futile attack on Tewodros at Dabra Berhan, Haile Melekot died of illness, nominating with his last breath his eleven-year-old son as successor (November 1855) under the name Negus Sahle Maryam (the future emperor Menelek II). Darge, Haile Melekot's brother, and Ato Bezabih, a Shewan noble, took charge of the young prince, but after a hard fight with Angeda, the Shewans were obliged to capitulate. Sahle Maryam was handed over to the Emperor Tewodoros and taken to Gondar. He was trained there in Tewodros's service, and then placed in comfortable detention at the fortress of Magdala. Tewodoros afterwards devoted himself to modernizing and centralizing the legal and administrative structure of his kingdom, against the resistance of his governors. Sahle Maryam of Shewa was married to Tewodros II's daughter Alitash.

In 1865, Sahle Maryam escaped from Magdala, abandoning his wife, and arrived in Shewa, and was there acclaimed as Negus. Tewodros forged an alliance between Britain and Ethiopia, but as explained in the next section, he committed suicide after a military defeat by the British. On the death of Tewodros, many Shewans, including Ras Darge, were released, and the young Negus of Shewa began to feel himself strong enough, after a few preliminary minor campaigns, to undertake offensive operations against the northern princes. However, these projects were of little avail, for Ras Kassai of Tigray had by this time (1872) risen to supreme power in the north. Proclaiming himself negusa nagast under the name of Yohannes IV (or John IV), he forced Sahle Maryam to acknowledge his overlordship.

In early 1868, the British force seeking Tewodros’ surrender, after he refused to release imprisoned British subjects, arrived on the coast of Massawa. The British and Dajazmach Kassa came to an agreement in which Kassa would let the British pass through Tigray (the British were going to Magdala which Tewodros had made his capital) in exchange for money and weapons. Surely enough, when the British completed their mission and were leaving the country, they rewarded Kassa for his cooperation with artillery, muskets, rifles, and munitions, all in all worth approximately £500,000. This formidable gift came in handy when in July 1871 the current emperor, Emperor Tekle Giyorgis II, attacked Kassa at his capital in Adwa, for Kassa had refused to be named a ras or pay tribute. Although Kassa's army was outnumbered 12,000 to the emperor's 60,000, Kassa's army was equipped with more modern weapons and better trained. At battle's end, forty percent of the emperor's men had been captured. The emperor was imprisoned and would die a year later. Six months later on 21 January 1872, Kassa became the new emperor under the name Yohannes IV.

Yohannes IV (1872–1889) 

Ethiopia was never colonized by a European power, but was occupied by Italians in 1936 (see below); however, several colonial powers had interests and designs on Ethiopia in the context of the 19th-century "Scramble for Africa."

When Victoria, Queen of the United Kingdom, in 1867 failed to answer a letter Tewodros II of Ethiopia had sent her, he took it as an insult and imprisoned several British residents, including the consul. An army of 12,000 was sent from Bombay to Ethiopia to rescue the captured nationals, under the command of Sir Robert Napier. The Ethiopians were defeated, and the British stormed the fortress of Magdala (now known as Amba Mariam) on April 13, 1868. When the Emperor heard that the gate had fallen, he fired a pistol into his mouth and killed himself. Sir Robert Napier was raised to the peerage, and given the title of Lord Napier of Magdala.

The Italians now came on the scene. Asseb, a port near the southern entrance of the Red Sea, had been bought from the local sultan in March 1870 by an Italian company, which, after acquiring more land in 1879 and 1880, was bought out by the Italian government in 1882. In this year Count Pietro Antonelli was dispatched to Shewa in order to improve the prospects of the colony by treaties with Sahle Maryam of Shewa and the sultan of Aussa.

In 1887 Menelik king of Shewa invaded the Emirate of Harar after his victory at the Battle of chelenqo.

In April 1888 the Italian forces, numbering over 20,000 men, came in contact with the Ethiopian army, but negotiations took the place of fighting, with the result that both forces retired, the Italians only leaving some 5,000 troops in Eritrea, later to become an Italian colony.

Meanwhile, Emperor Yohannes IV had been engaged with the dervishes, who had in the meantime become masters of the Egyptian Sudan, and in 1887 a great battle ensued at Gallabat, in which the dervishes, under Zeki Tumal, were beaten. But a stray bullet struck the king, and the Ethiopians decided to retire. The king died during the night, and his body fell into the hands of the enemy (March 9, 1889). When the news of Yohannes's death reached Sahle Maryam of Shewa, he proclaimed himself emperor Menelik II of Ethiopia, and received the submission of Begemder, Gojjam, the Yejju Oromo, and later Tigray.

Menelik II (1889–1913) 

On May 2 of that same year, Emperor Menelik signed the Treaty of Wuchale with the Italians, granting them a portion of Northern Ethiopia, the area that would later be Eritrea and part of the province of Tigray in return for the promise of 30,000 rifles, ammunition, and cannons. The Italians notified the European powers that this treaty gave them a protectorate over all of Ethiopia. Menelik protested, showing that the Amharic version of the treaty said no such thing, but his protests were ignored.

On March 1, 1896, Ethiopia's conflict with the Italians, the First Italo–Ethiopian War, was resolved by the complete defeat of the Italian armed forces at the Battle of Adowa. A provisional treaty of peace was concluded at Addis Ababa on October 26, 1896, which acknowledged the independence of Ethiopia.

Menelik granted the first railway concession, from the coast at Djibouti (French Somaliland) to the interior, to a French company in 1894. The railway was completed to Dire Dawa,  from Harrar, by the last day of 1902.

Under the reign of Menelik, beginning in the 1880s, Ethiopia set off from the central province of Shoa, to incorporate 'the lands and people of the South, East and West into an empire'. The people incorporated were the western Oromo (non Shoan Oromo), Sidama, Gurage, Wolayta and other groups. He began expanding his kingdom to the south and east, expanding into areas that had never been under his rule, resulting in the borders of Ethiopia of today. He did this with the help of Ras Gobena's Shewan Oromo militia. During the conquest of the Oromo, the Ethiopian Army carried genocidal mass atrocities against the Oromo population including mass mutilation, mass killings and large-scale slavery. Some estimates for the number of people killed as a result of the conquest go into the millions. Large-scale atrocities were also committed against the Dizi people and the people of the Kaficho kingdom. Slavery was of ancient origins in Ethiopia and continued into the early 20th century. It was widely practiced in the new territories, and tolerated by the authorities who often owned slaves themselves. Slaves could be bought and sold (but not to non-Christians), and had limited legal rights. They did have the right to worship, and the right not to have their families broken up by sales.

Iyasu V, Zauditu and Haile Selassie (1913–1936)

When Menelik II died, his grandson, Lij Iyassu, succeeded to the throne but soon lost support because of his Muslim ties. He was deposed in 1916 by the Christian nobility, and Menelik's daughter, Zauditu, was made empress. Her cousin, Ras Tafari Makonnen, was made regent and successor to the throne.

Upon the death of Empress Zauditu in 1930, Ras Tafari Makonnen, adopting the throne name Haile Selassie, was crowned Emperor Haile Selassie I of Ethiopia. His full title was "His Imperial Majesty Haile Selassie I, Conquering Lion of the Tribe of Judah, King of Kings of Ethiopia and Elect of God."

Following the death of Abba Jifar II of Jimma, Emperor Haile Selassie seized the opportunity to annex Jimma. In 1932, the Kingdom of Jimma was formally absorbed into Ethiopia. During the reorganization of the provinces in 1942, Jimma vanished into Kaffa Province.

The abolition of slavery became a high priority for the Haile Selassie regime. International pressures forced action, and it was required for membership in the League of Nations. Final success was achieved by 1942.

Educational modernization
Modernization became a priority for the Haile Selassie regime; it began with expanded education opportunities beyond the small old-fashioned schools run by the Ethiopian church. Menelik had founded the first modern school at Addis Ababa in 1908, and sent several students to Europe. Haile Selassie sent hundreds of young men and women to study abroad, set up the capital's second modern school in 1925. He established schools and a number of cities, as well as training institutions and technical schools. Missionaries were also active in education. By 1925 French Franciscan sisters were well-established, running an orphanage, a dispensary, a leper colony and 10 schools with 350 girl students. They settled in the cities of Addis Ababa and Dire Dawa, along the Franco-Ethiopian railway which opened in 1917. The schools were highly attractive to upper-class Ethiopians. In 1935, 119 Catholic and Protestant missions were educating 6717 pupils across the nation.

Italian occupation (1936–1941) 

Emperor Haile Selassie's reign was interrupted in 1935 when Italian forces invaded and occupied Ethiopia.

The Italian army, under the direction of dictator Benito Mussolini, invaded Ethiopian territory on October 2, 1935. They occupied the capital Addis Ababa on May 5. Emperor Haile Selassie pleaded to the League of Nations for aid in resisting the Italians. Nevertheless, the country was formally annexed on May 9, 1936, and the Emperor went into exile.

Many Ethiopians died in the invasion. The Negus claimed that more than 275,000 Ethiopian fighters were killed compared to only 1,537 Italians, while the Italian authorities estimated that 16,000 Ethiopians and 2,700 Italians (including Italian colonial troops) died in battle. Some 78,500 patriots (guerrilla fighters) died during the occupation, 17,800 civilians were killed by aerial bombardment and 35,000 people died in concentration camps.

War crimes were committed by both sides in this conflict. Italian troops used mustard gas in aerial bombardments (in violation of the Geneva Conventions) against combatants and civilians in an attempt to discourage the Ethiopian people from supporting the resistance. Deliberate Italian attacks against ambulances and hospitals of the Red Cross were reported. By all estimates, hundreds of thousands of Ethiopian civilians died as a result of the Italian invasion, including during the reprisal Yekatit 12 massacre in Addis Ababa, in which as many as 30,000 civilians were killed. Crimes by Ethiopian troops included the use of Dum-Dum bullets (in violation of the Hague Conventions), the killing of civilian workmen (including during the Gondrand massacre) and the mutilation of captured Eritrean Ascari and Italians (often with castration), beginning in the first weeks of war.

Italy in 1936 requested the League of Nations to recognize the annexation of Ethiopia. All member nations (including Britain and France), with the exception of the Soviet Union, voted to support it. The King of Italy (Victor Emmanuel III) was crowned Emperor of Ethiopia and the Italians created an Italian empire in Africa (Italian East Africa) with Ethiopia, Eritrea and Italian Somalia, with its capital Addis Abeba. In 1937 Mussolini boasted that, with his conquest of Ethiopia, "finally Adua was avenged" and that he had abolished slavery in Ethiopia, a practice that existed in the country for centuries.

The Italians made investments in Ethiopian infrastructure development during their occupation. They created the so-called "imperial road" between Addis Ababa and Massaua. More than 900 km of railways were reconstructed, dams and hydroelectric plants were built, and many public and private companies were established.

Much of these improvements were part of a plan to bring half a million Italians to colonize the Ethiopian plateaus. In October 1939 the Italian colonists in Ethiopia numbered 35,441, of whom 30,232 male (85.3%) and 5,209 female (14.7%), most of them living in urban areas. Only 3,200 Italian farmers moved to colonize farm areas (mostly in the Shewa Governorate), where they were under sporadic attack by pro-Haile Selassie guerrillas until the end of 1938.

The occupation government closed all schools operated by the Ethiopian church, or by missionaries. They were replaced with two new systems. There was a prestige operation for Italians, and rudimentary one for native Ethiopians. Textbooks featured the glory and power of Mussolini and promoted military careers. The natives were given a rudimentary primary education focused on producing submissive and obedient servants of the empire. New school buildings were constructed for the Italian colonists. The "Plan for development of Italian Addis Abeba" in 1939 proposed the creation of the first university in Ethiopia, but WW2 blocked it.

World War II 

In spring 1941 the Italians were defeated by British and Allied forces (including Ethiopian forces). On May 5, 1941, Emperor Haile Selassie re-entered Addis Ababa and returned to the throne. The Italians, after their final stand at Gondar in November 1941, conducted a guerrilla war in Ethiopia, that lasted until summer 1943. After the defeat of Italy, Ethiopia underwent a short period of British military administration, and full sovereignty was restored in 1944, although some regions remained under British control for more years. Eritrea became an autonomous part of Ethiopia in 1952, until its war of independence.

Post–World War II period (1941–1974) 

After World War II, Emperor Haile Selassie made numerous efforts to promote the modernization of his nation. The country's first important school of higher education, University College of Addis Ababa, was founded in 1950. The Constitution of 1931 was replaced with the 1955 constitution which expanded the powers of the Parliament. While improving diplomatic ties with the United States, Haile Selassie also sought to improve the nation's relationship with other African nations. To do this, in 1963, he helped to found the Organisation of African Unity.

In 1961 the 30-year Eritrean Struggle for Independence began, following the Ethiopian Emperor Haile Selassie I's dissolution of the federation and shutting down the Eritrean parliament. The Emperor declared Eritrea the fourteenth province of Ethiopia in 1962. The Negus suffered criticism due to the expenses involved in fighting the Nationalist forces.

By the early 1970s Emperor Haile Selassie's advanced age was becoming apparent. As Paul B. Henze explains: "Most Ethiopians thought in terms of personalities, not ideology, and out of long habit still looked to Haile Selassie as the initiator of change, the source of status and privilege, and the arbiter of demands for resources and attention among competing groups." The nature of the succession, and of the desirability of the Imperial monarchy in general, were in dispute amongst the Ethiopian people.

Perceptions of this war as imperialist were among the primary causes of the growing Ethiopian Communist movement. In the early 1970s, the Ethiopian Communists received the support of the Soviet Union under the leadership of Leonid Brezhnev. This help led to the 1974 coup of Mengistu.

The government's failure to effect significant economic and political reforms over the previous fourteen years created a climate of unrest. Combined with rising inflation, corruption, a famine that affected several provinces (especially Welo and Tigray) but was concealed from the outside world, and the growing discontent of urban interest groups, the country was ripe for revolution. The unrest that began in January 1974 became an outburst of general discontent. The Ethiopian military began to both organize and incite a full-fledged revolution.

Communist period (1974–1991)

After a period of civil unrest that began in February 1974, a provisional administrative council of soldiers, known as the Derg ("committee"), seized power from the aging Emperor Haile Selassie I on September 12, 1974, and installed a government that was socialist in name and military in style. The Derg summarily executed 59 members of the former government, including two former prime ministers and crown councilors, court officials, ministers, and generals. Emperor Haile Selassie died on August 22, 1975. He was allegedly strangled in the basement of his palace or smothered with a wet pillow.

Lt. Col. Mengistu Haile Mariam assumed power as head of state and Derg chairman, after having his two predecessors killed, as well as tens of thousands of other suspected opponents. The new government undertook socialist reforms, including nationalisation of landlords' property and the church's property. Before the coup, Ethiopian peasants' way of life was thoroughly influenced by the church teachings; 280 days a year are religious feasts or days of rest. Mengistu's years in office were marked by a totalitarian-style government and the country's massive militarization, financed by the Soviet Union and the Eastern Bloc, and assisted by Cuba. In December 1976, an Ethiopian delegation in Moscow signed a military assistance agreement with the Soviet Union. The following April 1977, Ethiopia abrogated its military assistance agreement with the United States and expelled the American military missions.

The new regime in Ethiopia met with armed resistance from the large landowners, the royalists and the nobility. The resistance was largely centered in the province of Eritrea. The Derg decided in November 1974 to pursue war in Eritrea rather than seek a negotiated settlement. By mid-1976, the resistance had gained control of most of the towns and the countryside of Eritrea.

In July 1977, sensing the disarray in Ethiopia, Somalia attacked across the Ogaden in pursuit of its irredentist claims to the ethnic Somali areas of Ethiopia (see Ogaden War). They were assisted in this invasion by the armed Western Somali Liberation Front. Ethiopian forces were driven back far inside their own frontiers but, with the assistance of a massive Soviet airlift of arms and 17,000 Cuban combat forces, they stemmed the attack. The last major Somali regular units left the Ogaden March 15, 1978. Twenty years later, the Somali region of Ethiopia remained under-developed and insecure.

From 1977 through early 1978, thousands of suspected enemies of the Derg were tortured and/or killed in a purge called the Qey Shibir ("Red Terror"). Communism was officially adopted during the late 1970s and early 1980s; in 1984, the Workers' Party of Ethiopia (WPE) was established, and on February 1, 1987, a new Soviet-style civilian constitution was submitted to a popular referendum. It was officially endorsed by 81% of voters, and in accordance with this new constitution, the country was renamed the People's Democratic Republic of Ethiopia on September 10, 1987, and Mengistu became president.

The regime's collapse was hastened by droughts and a famine, which affected around 8 million people and left 1 million dead, as well as by insurrections, particularly in the northern regions of Tigray and Eritrea. The regime also conducted a brutal campaign of resettlement and villagization in Ethiopia in the 1980s. In 1989, the Tigrayan Peoples' Liberation Front (TPLF) merged with other ethnically based opposition movements to form the Ethiopian Peoples' Revolutionary Democratic Front (EPRDF). In May 1991, EPRDF forces advanced on Addis Ababa. Mengistu fled the country to asylum in Zimbabwe, where he still resides.

Hundreds of thousands were killed due to the Red Terror, forced deportations, or from using hunger as a weapon. In 2006, after a long trial, Mengistu was found guilty of genocide. The Derg government relocated numerous Amharas into southern Ethiopia where they served in government administration, courts, and even in school, where Oromo texts were eliminated and replaced by Amharic. The government perceived the various southern minority languages as hindrances to Ethiopian national identity expansion.

Tigray People's Liberation Front dominance (1991–2018) 

In July 1991, the EPRDF, the Oromo Liberation Front (OLF) and others, established the Transitional Government of Ethiopia (TGE), which was composed of an 87-member Council of Representatives and guided by a national charter that functioned as a transitional constitution. In June 1992, the OLF withdrew from the government; in March 1993, members of the Southern Ethiopia Peoples' Democratic Coalition also left the government.

Eritrea separated from Ethiopia following the fall of the Derg in 1991, after a long independentist war.

In 1994, a new constitution was written that formed a bicameral legislature and a judicial system. A general election in 1995 to elect the Parliament also elected Meles Zenawi as prime minister and Negasso Gidada as president. Ethiopia's second multiparty election was held in 2000 and Meles was re-elected as prime minister. In October 2001, Lieutenant Girma Wolde-Giorgis was elected president. In the 2005 general election, allegations of irregularities that brought victory to the Ethiopian People's Revolutionary Democratic Front resulted in widespread protests in which the government is accused of massacring civilians (see Ethiopian police massacres).

With the collapse of the Soviet Union, and with the rise of radical Islamism, Ethiopia again turned to the Western powers for alliance and assistance. After the September 11 attacks in 2001, the Ethiopian army began to train with US forces based out of the Combined Joint Task Force – Horn of Africa (CJTF-HOA) established in Djibouti, in counterterrorism and counterinsurgency. Ethiopia allowed the US to station military advisors at Camp Hurso.

In 2006, an Islamic organisation seen by many as having ties with al-Qaeda, the Islamic Courts Union (ICU), spread rapidly in Somalia. Ethiopia sent logistical support to the Transitional Federal Government opposing the Islamists. Finally, on December 20, 2006, active fighting broke out between the ICU and Ethiopian Army. As the Islamist forces were of no match against the Ethiopian regular army, they decided to retreat and merge among the civilians, and most of the ICU-held Somalia was quickly taken. Human Rights Watch accused Ethiopia of various abuses including indiscriminate killing of civilians during the Battle of Mogadishu (March – April 2007). Ethiopian forces pulled out of Somalia in January 2009, leaving a small African Union force and smaller Somali Transitional Government force to maintain the peace. Reports immediately emerged of religious fundamentalist forces occupying one of two former Ethiopian bases in Mogadishu shortly after withdrawal.

Meles Zenawi died on 20 August 2012 and was succeeded as prime minister by Hailemariam Desalegn. On 7 October 2013, Mulatu Teshome was elected president of the country.

Recent history 

Protests broke out across the country, many from the largest ethnic group, the Oromo, in 2016 demanding an end to human rights abuses and the release of political prisoners. Following these protests, Ethiopia declared a state of emergency in October 2016 which was lifted in August 2017. On 16 February 2018, the government declared a six-month nationwide state of emergency following the resignation of Prime Minister Hailemariam Desalegn who said he wanted to clear the way for reforms. On 2 April 2018, Abiy Ahmed, an Oromo, was declared Prime Minister. Sahle-Work Zewde is the 4th and current president of Ethiopia, the first woman to hold the office.

Ethnic violence rose with the political unrest. There were Oromo–Somali clashes between the Oromo, who make up the largest ethnic group in the country, and the ethnic Somalis, leading to up to 400,000 to be displaced in 2017. Gedeo–Oromo clashes between the Oromo and the Gedeo people in the south of the country led to Ethiopia having the largest number of people to flee their homes in the world in 2018, with 1.4 million newly displaced people. In September 2018 in the minorities protest that took place in Oromo near the Ethiopian capital Addis Ababa, 23 people were killed. Some have blamed Prime Minister Abiy Ahmed for giving space to groups formerly banned by previous Tigrayan led governments, such as the Oromo Liberation Front, Ginbot 7, ONLF and Sidama Liberation Front .

In September 2018, Prime Minister Abiy Ahmed Ali and Eritrean President Isaias Afwerki signed a historic peace agreement, ending 16 years of hostility between the two countries (“no war, no peace” stalemate). As the result of the agreement, Abiy Ahmed received the Nobel Peace Prize 2019.

Fano is an Amhara youth group in Ethiopia, perceived as either a protest group or an armed militia. Fano units are accused of participating in ethnic massacres, including that of 58 Qemant people in Metemma during 10–11 January 2019 . and of armed actions in Humera in November 2020 during the Tigray conflict.

Relations between the federal government and the Tigray regional government deteriorated after the election, and on 4 November 2020, Abiy began a military offensive in the Tigray Region in response to attacks on army units stationed there, causing thousands of refugees to flee to neighboring Sudan. According to local media, up to 500 civilians may have been killed in a massacre in the town of Mai Kadra on 9 November 2020. Due to conflicts between TPLF's Militia and Ethiopian security forces in alliance with Amhara regional special forces, 25,000 refugees fled from Tigray to Sudan.

See also

References

Videography 
 Adwa: an African victory, Haïlé Gerima, US, 1999, Mypheduh Films, 97 min
 Fascist Legacy, Ken Kirby, Royaume-Uni, 1989, documentary 2x50min

Historical documents 
 d'Abaddie, Arnauld Michel (1815–1894?), Douze ans de séjour dans la Haute-Éthiopie, Tome Ier, Paris, 1868
 Alvares, Francisco in: Giovanni Battista Ramusio Historiale description de l'Ethiopie, contenant vraye relation des terres, & pais du grand Roy & Empereur Prete-Ian, l'assiette de ses royaumes & provinces, leurs coutumes, loix & religion, avec les pourtraits de leur temples & autres singularitez, cy devant non cogneues, Anvers, Omnisys, 1558, BNF
 
 Blanc, Henri (1831–1911), Ma captivité en Abyssinie sous l'empereur Théodoros – avec des détails sur l'Empereur Theodros, sa vie, ses mœurs, son peuple, son pays, traduit de l'anglais par Madame Arbousse-Bastide.
 Bruce, James, Jean-Henri Castéra, Charles-Joseph Panckoucke, Pierre Plassan, Voyage en Nubie et en Abyssinie entrepris pour découvrir les sources du Nil, Paris, 1791
 Budge, E. A. Wallis,  The Queen of Sheba and her only son Menelik, London 1932.
 Castanhoso, The Portuguese expedition to Abyssinia in 1541–1543 as narrated by Castanhoso; translated and introduced by Whitrich (Archive.org)
 Ferret, Pierre Victor Ad., Joseph Germain Galinier Voyage en Abyssinie dans les provinces du Tigré, du Samen et de l'Amhara, Paris, 1847
  Giffre de Rechac, Jean de Les estranges evenemens du voyage de Son Altesse, le serenissime prince Zaga-Christ d'Ethiopie, Hachette, Paris, 1635, BNF
 The Periplus of the Erythraean Sea Travel and Trade in the Indian Ocean by a Merchant of the First Century
 Reybaud, Louis Voyage dans l’Abyssinie méridionale, Revue des Deux Mondes, tome 27, Paris, 1841
 (Amharic) Original letters from Ethiopian emperors, website of the national archives of Addis Abeba

Articles
 A Brief History of Trade and Business in Ethiopia from Ancient to Modern Times, Richard Pankhurst, 1999: set of 2 articles published in the Addis Tribune summarizing a speech by Dr. Pankhurst at the 74’th District Conference and Assembly of Rotary International, in Addis Ababa 7–9 May 1999
 Ethiopia Across the Red Sea and Indian Ocean, Richard Pankhurst, 1999: set of 3 articles published in the Addis Tribune newspaper in Addis Ababa, Ethiopia, on the relations between Ethiopia and countries on the Indian Ocean in ancient and early medieval times
 A History of Early Twentieth Century Ethiopia, Richard Pankhurst, 1997: set of 20 articles published in the Addis Tribune summarizing the history of Ethiopia from the beginning of the 20th century until the 1960s
  Article published in the Addis Tribune showing how Eritrea has historically been a part of Ethiopia
 Mauri, Arnaldo (2003), "The early development of banking in Ethiopia", International Review of Economics, Vol. 50, n. 4, pp. 521–543. Abstract
 Mauri, Arnaldo (2009), "The re-establishment of the national monetary and banking system in Ethiopia, 1941–1963", South African Journal of Economic History, Vol. 24, n. 2, pp. 82–130.
 Mauri, Arnaldo (2010), "Monetary developments and decolonization in Ethiopia", Acta Universitatis Danubius Œconomica, Vol. 6, n. 1, pp. 5–16.  and

Further reading
 African Zion, the Sacred Art of Ethiopia. New Haven: Yale University Press, 1993.
 
 
 
 
 Dunn, John. "'For God, Emperor, and Country!' The Evolution of Ethiopia's Nineteenth-Century Army" War in History 1#3 (1994): 278–99. https://doi.org/10.1177/096834459400100303
 Gibbons, Ann (2007). The First Human : The Race to Discover our Earliest Ancestor. Anchor Books. 
 
Johanson, Donald & Wong, Kate (2009). Lucy's Legacy : The Quest for Human Origins. Three Rivers Press. 
 Marcus, Harold (1994). A History of Ethiopia. Berkeley.
 
 
 
 
  
 
 Sergew Hable Selassie (1972). Ancient and Medieval Ethiopian History to 1270. Addis Ababa: United Printers.
 Shinn, David H. Historical Dictionary of Ethiopia (2013)
 Taddesse Tamrat (2009). Church and State in Ethiopia, 1270–1527. Hollywood, CA: Tsehai Publishers & Distributors, second printing with new preface and new foreword.
 Vestal, Theodor M. (2007). "Consequences of the British occupation of Ethiopia during World War II", B. J. Ward (ed), Rediscovering the British Empire. Melbourne.

Historiography 
 Crummey, Donald. "Society, State and Nationality in the Recent Historiography of Ethiopia" Journal of African History 31#1 (1990), pp. 103–119 online

External links

 Ethiopian warrior, Ancient Greek Alabastron, 480-470 BC
 ETHIOPIA – A Country Study (at the Library of Congress)
 "The history of the Federal Democratic Republic of Ethiopia" (Hartford Web Publishing website)